Rofrano is a town and comune of the province of Salerno in the Campania region of south-west Italy. It is located in the southern Cilento. In 2015 its population was 1,539.

History
The village was first settled between 3rd and 4th century by some farmers and was originally called Ruffium.

Geography

Overview
Rofrano is situated on a hill below the Apennine Mountains and is surrounded mainly by forests. The town is 39 km from Vallo della Lucania, 55 km from Sala Consilina and 139 km from Salerno. Its municipal territory is adjacent to Alfano, Caselle in Pittari, Laurino, Laurito, Montano Antilia, Novi Velia, Roccagloriosa, Sanza, Torre Orsaia and Valle dell'Angelo. Its northernmost point shares part of the territory of Pruno with Laurino. To the north-west of the municipality, on the road to Sanza, is the Cervati, one of the highest mountains of Campania.

Frazioni
The hamlets (frazioni) of Rofrano are the villages of Cerreto and San Menale. Other localities, consisting mainly of some scattered farmhouses, are Abbenante, Fornillo, Pozzillo Borsito, Provitera, San Leo and Treppaoli.

San Menale is located near Rofrano. With a population of 214, it is the most populous hamlet. The river Faraone crosses the south side of the village.
Cerreto is located in south of the municipality, near the borders with Torre Orsaia and its hamlet Borgo Cerreto, and counts a population of 4.

Gallery

See also
Cilentan dialect
Cilento and Vallo di Diano National Park

References

External links

 Rofrano official website

Cities and towns in Campania
Localities of Cilento